Cheshmeh Dozdak may refer to:
 Cheshmeh Dozdak-e Olya
 Cheshmeh Dozdak-e Sofla